The Metropolitan Junior Hockey League was an American Tier III Junior ice hockey league with teams throughout the eastern United States. The MJHL was part of the Atlantic Metropolitan Hockey League organization.  Founded in 1966 by New York Rangers GM, Emile Francis, the Metropolitan Junior Hockey League played its 50th season in 2015–16. Prior to its 51st season, the league's operations were taken over by the North American Hockey League and it was renamed to North American 3 Atlantic Hockey League (NA3AHL) for the 2016–17 season. In 2017, the remaining teams joined the Eastern Hockey League.

History
The MetJHL was affiliated with higher level Atlantic Junior Hockey League (AJHL), a Tier III Junior A league, while the MetJHL was sanctioned as a Tier III Junior B league until 2011 when USA Hockey dropped the letter designations in Tier III. In May 2012, the AJHL left the Atlantic Metropolitan Hockey League family and became its own entity managed by the team owners. In 2013, as part of a large re-organization of Tier III junior hockey, the AJHL re-branded itself to the Eastern Hockey League (EHL).

The league does place a number of players into NCAA colleges, with most going to Division III, and some to Division I.

During the off-season of 2014, several new organizations joined the MET League and it became a 23 team league and added a fourth division.  In December 2014, the Eastern Hockey League (EHL) announced the formation of an Elite Division for the 2015–16 season, which effectively removed eight developmental teams for the EHL from the MJHL. The Metropolitan league planned to offset the loss with the return of New Jersey Rockets and the addition of teams from the New Jersey Colonials organization. The Metropolitan Junior Hockey League would also drop its MET League and MetJHL monikers to just MJHL (likely due to the Minnesota Junior Hockey League (MnJHL) and Midwest Junior Hockey League (MWJHL) ceasing operations after the 2014–15 season).

After the league's 50th season in 2015–16, the league lost another eight teams to the EHL-Elite Division (then renamed to EHL-19U Elite). On March 29, 2016, the league announced that its operations had been acquired by the Tier II North American Hockey League and was renamed to the North American 3 Atlantic Hockey League (NA3AHL).

In February 2017, the EHL announced that they would expand after the league lost several teams to the United States Premier Hockey League's new tuition-free based league, the National Collegiate Development Conference (NCDC). Of the new teams added to the EHL, six were from the NA3AHL: the Central Penn Panthers, Jersey Wildcats, Long Island Royals, Metro Fighting Moose, New Jersey Renegades, and the Wilkes-Barre/Scranton Knights. The only NA3AHL team not included was the Exton Bulls who were sitting at last place with two wins while also regularly losing by double-digit scores. The Metro Fighting Moose would leave the EHL after the announcement for the USPHL during the 2017 offseason.

The Long Island Royals were the final Foster Cup champions.

Final teams

Former teams

See also
List of ice hockey leagues

References

External links
NA3AHL website
Old Metropolitan Junior Hockey League website

3